Taeniopoda is a genus of horse lubbers in the family Romaleidae. There are about 12 described species in Taeniopoda.
In Costa Rica is more often seen from early June to July at its nymphal stage to fully matured, crawling around the banana plantations on the Caribbean slope.

Species
These 12 species belong to the genus Taeniopoda:

 Taeniopoda auricornis (Walker, 1870)
 Taeniopoda bicristata Bruner, 1907
 Taeniopoda centurio (Drury, 1770)
 Taeniopoda citricornis Bruner, 1907
 Taeniopoda eques (Burmeister, 1838) (horse lubber)
 Taeniopoda gutturosa Bolívar, 1901
 Taeniopoda obscura Bruner, 1907
 Taeniopoda picticornis (Walker, 1870)
 Taeniopoda reticulata (Fabricius, 1781)
 Taeniopoda stali Bruner, 1907
 Taeniopoda tamaulipensis Rehn, 1904
 Taeniopoda varipennis Rehn, 1905

Description
This purple grasshopper has red antennas the whole size is about 2 inches long. It has black stripes leave like pattern on wings coverings, legs and body.
A bright crimson red on wings is displayed, it has eyed like pattern when both wings are opened on flight as a defense mechanism.

References

Further reading

External links

 

Romaleidae
Orthoptera of North America